Galinsoga longipes is a Mexican species of flowering plant in the family Asteraceae. It has been found in the States of Michoacán, México, Morelos, and Guerrero in western and central Mexico.

Description
Each head has 5 white ray flowers surrounding 35-100 yellow disc flowers.

References

longipes
Flora of Mexico
Plants described in 1977